The Collegiate Water Polo Association is a conference of colleges and universities in the Eastern United States that sponsor 19 men's teams and 17 women's teams that compete in varsity water polo. The winners of the conference tournaments earn one of the four spots in the NCAA Men's Water Polo Championship and one of the eight spots in the NCAA Women's Water Polo Championship. The CWPA sponsors club team competition in 17 men's divisions and 13 women's divisions across the United States.

History
The conference was founded in the early 1970s as the Mid Atlantic Conference by Dick Russell, the swimming and water polo coach at Bucknell university with member schools from New York, Pennsylvania, New Jersey, and Maryland. The first conference championship was held in 1972, with Yale defeating Harvard.

The organization was run by the conferences coaches until a commissioner was hired in 1990. In 1993, the Mid Atlantic Conference admitted the full memberships of the New England and Southern Conferences, changing its name to the Mid Atlantic Conference with 39 varsity and club member schools. The following year, the conference went co-ed, raising the number of member teams to 55. As the organization expanded into the Midwest in 1995, the referees from the Eastern Water Polo Referees Association opted to go on strike, so the conference established its own refereeing bureau. With 95 teams from the northeast, midwest, and south, the conference took its present name in 1996.

The CWPA continued expanding, entering the northwest in 1998, the Great Plains and California in 1999, and now has membership in 43 of the contiguous 48 States.

CWPA staff
Commissioner- Dan Sharadin
Assistant Commissioner- Tom Tracey
Director of Communications- Ed Haas
Membership Services- Ian Thompson
Director of Multimedia- Justin Cypert
Director of Officials- Ed Reed

Varsity teams competing in the CWPA

Men's teams

Mid-Atlantic–East Division
NORTHERN SECTION
 Fordham
 Iona
 La Salle
SOUTHERN SECTION
 Bucknell
 George Washington
 Navy

Mid-Atlantic–West Division
 Gannon
 Mercyhurst
 McKendree
 Mount St. Mary's
 Salem
 Washington & Jefferson

Women's teams

Division I
 Brown
 Bucknell
 George Washington
 Harvard
 Michigan
 Princeton
 Saint Francis (PA)

Division III
 Austin College
 Carthage
 Connecticut College
 Grove City
 Macalester
 Monmouth (IL)
 Penn State Behrend
 Utica
 Washington & Jefferson
 Wittenberg

Club teams competing in the CWPA

Men's teams

Atlantic Division
Georgetown
James Madison
Maryland
Navy
North Carolina
NC State
Virginia
Virginia Tech
Wake Forest

Big Ten Division
Illinois
Indiana
Iowa
Michigan
Michigan State
Northwestern
Ohio State
Purdue
Wisconsin

Colonial Division
Amherst
Coast Guard
UMass
Middlebury
Wesleyan
Williams
WPI

Florida Division
UCF "A"
UCF "B"
Florida "A"
Florida "B"
Florida Atlantic
Florida Gulf Coast
Florida State
Miami (Fla.)

Great Lakes Division
Cincinnati
Davenport
Dayton
Grand Valley State
Miami (Ohio)
Notre Dame
Xavier

Heartland Division
Augustana (IL)
Carleton
Grinnell
Knox
Macalester
Saint John's (MN)
St. Mary's (MN)
St. Olaf

Mid Atlantic Division A
Carnegie Mellon
Drexel
Penn
Penn State "A"
Penn State "B"
Pittsburgh
Villanova

Mid Atlantic Division B
Albright
Bloomsburg
Bucknell
Delaware
Lehigh
Rutgers
Saint Joseph's
West Chester

Missouri Valley Division
Lindenwood "A"
Lindenwood "B"
McKendree
Missouri
Missouri S&T
Saint Louis
Washington University in St. Louis

New England Division
Boston College
Boston University
UConn
Dartmouth
Northeastern
Tufts
Yale

New York Division Eastern Region
Columbia
NYU
RPI
Merchant Marine
Army

New York Division Western Region
Binghamton
Buffalo
Cornell "A"
Cornell "B"
Hamilton
Syracuse

North Atlantic Division
Bates
Bowdoin
Colby
Vermont

Northwest Division
Boise State
Central Washington
Oregon
Oregon State
Seattle
Washington
Western Washington

Pacific Coast Division
Cal Poly "A"
Cal Poly "B"
UCLA "A"
UCLA "B"
Long Beach State
UC Santa Barbara
USC

Rocky Mountain Division
Colorado "A"
Colorado "B"
Colorado Mesa
Colorado School of Mines
Colorado State
Denver
New Mexico
Utah "A"
Utah "B"
Utah State
Wyoming

Sierra Pacific Division
California
UC Davis "A"
UC Davis "B"
UC Merced
UC Santa Cruz
Cal State Chico
California Maritime
Cal State Monterey
San Jose State
Stanford

Southeast Division
Alabama
Auburn
Clemson
Georgia
Georgia Southern
Georgia Tech
Kennesaw State
Tennessee
Vanderbilt

Southwest Division
Arizona
Arizona State
UC Irvine
UC San Diego "A"
UC San Diego "B"
Cal State Northridge
San Diego
San Diego State

Texas Division
Baylor
Houston
LSU
Rice
Texas A&M "A"
Texas A&M "B"
Texas State
Texas Tech
Texas "A"
Texas "B"

Men's Division III Collegiate Club Champions

1999 Wesleyan University
2000 RIT
2001 Trinity University
2002 RIT
2003 Middlebury College
2004 Wesleyan University
2005 Wesleyan University
2006 Lindenwood University
2007 Lindenwood University
2008 Lindenwood University
2009 Tufts University
2010 UC-Santa Cruz
2011 Washington University in St. Louis
2012 Monmouth College
2013 UC-Santa Cruz
2014 UC-Santa Cruz/Washington University in St. Louis (Co-Champions)
2015 Washington University in St. Louis
2016 Washington University in St. Louis
2017 Washington University in St. Louis
2018 Washington University in St. Louis
2019 Washington University in St. Louis
2020 Cancelled due to COVID-19 pandemic
2021 Cancelled

Men's National Collegiate Club Champions

1993 Northwestern University 
1994 United States Military Academy  
1995 University of Dayton 
1996 University of Michigan 
1997 Dartmouth College 
1998 University of Michigan 
1999 Cal Poly State University 
2000 Michigan State University 
2001 Cal Poly State University 
2002 Cal Poly State University 
2003 University of Michigan 
2004 Cal Poly State University 
2005 Grand Valley State University 
2006 Michigan State University 
2007 Cal Poly State University
2008 Michigan State University 
2009 UCLA  
2010 UCLA  
2011 USC  
2012 USC 
2013 UCLA  
2014 Lindenwood University 
2015 Lindenwood University
2016 Lindenwood University
2017 San Diego State University
2018 Lindenwood University
2019 Lindenwood University
2020 Canceled due to COVID-19 pandemic
2021 Michigan State University
2022 UC San Diego

Women's teams

Atlantic Division
Duke
Georgetown
James Madison
North Carolina
Virginia
Virginia Tech

Big Ten Division
Illinois
Iowa
Michigan "A"
Michigan "B"
Michigan State
Ohio State
Purdue
Wisconsin

Heartland Division
Augustana
Carleton
Grinnell
Knox
St. Mary's (MN)
St. Olaf

Mid Atlantic Division
Carnegie Mellon
Penn
Penn State Blue
Penn State White
Pittsburgh
West Chester

Midwest Division
Cincinnati
Grand Valley State "A"
Grand Valley State "B"
Illinois State
Lindenwood
Miami (Ohio)
Notre Dame
Ohio
Saint Louis
Washington (St. Louis)

New England Division
Boston College
Boston University
Dartmouth
UMass
Northeastern
Wesleyan
Williams

New York Division
Colgate
Columbia
Cornell
Hamilton
Hartwick
NYU
Syracuse

North Atlantic Division
Bates
Bowdoin
Coast Guard "A"
Coast Guard "B"
MIT
Middlebury
Tufts
Wellesley
Yale

Northwest Division
Oregon "A"
Oregon "B"
Oregon State
Portland State
Washington
Western Washington

Pacific Coast Division
Cal Poly "A"
Cal Poly "B"
Long Beach State
UCLA "A"
UCLA "B"
UC Riverside
UC Santa Barbara "A"
UC Santa Barbara "B"
USC

Rocky Mountain Division
Air Force
Colorado
Colorado School of Mines
Colorado State
Denver
New Mexico

Sierra Pacific Division
California "A"
California "B"
UC Davis "A"
UC Davis "B"
California Maritime
Cal State Chico
Fresno State
Saint Mary's (CA)
San Jose State
UC Santa Cruz "A"
UC Santa Cruz "B"

Southeast Division
UCF
Emory
Florida "A"
Florida "B"
FAU
Florida State
Georgia Tech

Southwest Division
Arizona
Arizona State
UC Irvine
UC San Diego "A"
UC San Diego "B"
San Diego
San Diego State "A"
San Diego State "B"

Texas Division
Baylor
Rice
Texas
Texas A&M "A"
Texas A&M "B"
Texas State

Women's Division III Collegiate Club Champions

2019 Middlebury College
2020 Cancelled due to COVID-19 pandemic
2021 Competition not held

Women's National Collegiate Club Champions

2000 University of Washington 
2001 Michigan State University
2002 Michigan State University 
2003 California Polytechnic State University
2004 California Polytechnic State University
2005 California Polytechnic State University
2006 Michigan State University 
2007 Fresno State University
2008 California Polytechnic State University
2009 California Polytechnic State University
2010 California Polytechnic State University 
2011 California Polytechnic State University
2012 University of California-Davis
2013 University of California-Davis
2014 San Diego State University
2015 University of California
2016 University of California-Santa Barbara
2017 University of California-Davis
2018 University of California-Davis
2019 University of Florida
2020 Cancelled due to COVID-19 pandemic
2021 Competition not held

See also
 USA Water Polo Hall of Fame

References

External links
Official Website of the CWPA

NCAA Division I conferences
College water polo in the United States
Sports leagues established in 1972
1972 establishments in the United States